Jurica Pavlic (born 14 June 1989, in Goričan, Croatia) is a Croatian speedway rider. He was the 2007 Individual European Champion and winner of the 2006 Under-19 Individual European Championship. He rode for Unia Leszno in the Polish Ekstraliga and rode for the Swindon Robins in the British Elite League. His father, Zvonko Pavlic, was also a speedway rider, and was a three-time Yugoslavian Champion.

Speedway Grand Prix results

Honours

Individual U-21 World Championship
 2006 - 11th place (5 points)
 2007 - 4th place (10 points)
 2008 - 3rd place (12 points)
 2009 -  Goričan - Runner-up place (12+3 pts)

Individual European Championship
 2006 - 12th place (6 points)
 2007 - Winner (14 points)

Individual U-19 European Championship
 2006 - Winner (14 points)
 2007 - 2nd (11 points)

European Pairs Championship
 2007 - 5th place in Semi-Final 2 (15 points)

U-19 European Team Championship
 2008 - 3rd place in Semi-Final (18 points)

European Club Champions' Cup
 2007 - 4th place (2 points)

Polish Ekstraliga Championship
 2007 - Champion with Unia Leszno

See also 
 Croatia national speedway team
 List of Speedway Grand Prix riders

References

External links 
  

1989 births
Living people
Croatian speedway riders
Individual Speedway European Champions
Individual Speedway Junior European Champions